Joseph-Édouard Perrault,  (July 30, 1874 – June 13, 1948) was a lawyer and political figure in Quebec. He represented Arthabaska from 1916 to 1936 in the Legislative Assembly of Quebec as a Liberal member.

He was born in La Malbaie, Quebec, the son of Joseph-Stanislas Perrault and Louisa Brault. Perrault was educated at Sainte-Anne-de-la-Pocatière, at the Séminaire de Québec and the Université Laval. He articled in law with Charles Fitzpatrick, Nazaire-Nicolas Olivier and Louis-Alexandre Taschereau, was called to the Quebec bar in 1898 and set up practice in Arthabaska. He later practised in partnership with his brother Gustave and Wilfrid Girouard. From 1906 to 1916, he was crown prosecutor for Arthabaska district. In 1908, Perrault was named King's Counsel. He was bâtonnier for Arthabaska district from 1909 to 1911 and from 1921 to 1922; he was also bâtonnier for the Quebec bar in 1921 and 1922. Perrault served on the boards of directors for several companies. He was also president of Flax Industries. He served as chair of the school board from 1906 to 1916 and as alderman for the town council for Arthabaska from 1907 to 1916. In 1908, he married Madeleine Richard.

Perrault was an unsuccessful candidate for a seat in the House of Commons in 1910 in Drummond—Arthabaska. He was elected to the Quebec assembly as the member for Arthabaska in 1916 and re-elected in 1919.  In 1923, he was elected in both Arthabaska and Abitibi, resigning the Abitibi seat later that year to represent Arthabaska.  He was subsequently re-elected in 1927, 1931 and 1935.

He served in the Quebec cabinet as Minister of Colonization, Mines and Fisheries from 1919 to 1929, as Minister of Highways from 1929 to 1936, Minister of Colonization from 1935 to 1936 and Solicitor General in 1936.

He retired from politics in 1936 and returned to practice in Montreal. Perrault died in Montreal at the age of 73.

References 
 

1839 births
1912 deaths
Quebec Liberal Party MNAs
Lawyers in Quebec
Canadian King's Counsel
Université Laval alumni